Kuh-e Dera (also Romanized as Kūh-e Derā, Kūh-e Darā, and Kuh-i-Dera; also known as Kūh-e Dareh) is a village in Mahur Rural District, Mahvarmilani District, Mamasani County, Fars Province, Iran. At the 2006 census, its population was 53, in 13 families.

References 

Populated places in Mamasani County